Primary education in the Democratic Republic of the Congo (DRC) is not free or compulsory.

The education system in the Democratic Republic of the Congo is governed by three government ministries: the Ministère de l’Enseignement Primaire, Secondaire et Professionnel (MEPSP), the Ministère de l’Enseignement Supérieur et Universitaire (MESU) and the  Ministère des Affaires Sociales (MAS).

As a result of the 6-year civil war in the late 1990s-early 2000s, over 5.2 million children in the country did not receive any education. Since the end of the civil war, the situation has improved tremendously, with the number of children enrolled in primary schools rising from 5.5 million in 2002 to 13.5 million in 2014, and the number of children enrolled in secondary schools rising from 2.8 million in 2007 to 4.4 million in 2014 according to UNESCO.

Background
The educational system in the DRC is similar to that of Belgium in that there are 6 years of  primary followed by 6 years of secondary education (the education system has suffered from decades of conflict although recent years have shown an improvement).

In 2000, 65 percent of children ages 10 to 14 were attending school. As a result of the 6-year civil war, over 5.2 million children in the country receive no education. Official numbers for the school year 2009–10, report there were 35,915 primary schools serving 10,572,422 students; and 17,373 secondary schools serving 3,484,459 others.

Of the 10 provinces the hardest hit by a lack of education are the North and South Kivu. More than 42% of children in these provinces have never been to school.

Despite government initiatives making primary education free in the Democratic Republic of Congo (DRC) in 2010, access as well as attendance remains poor amongst children. Currently, 25 percent of the primary school-aged children and 60 percent of adolescents are not enrolled in classes. Severe shortage of teachers in public schools are another concern with the education system. The national average for primary schools is one teacher for 37 pupils; however, marginalized or rural areas endure much worse ratios. On average, educational programs in marginalized areas consist of one teacher to 100 pupils per class.
Complications in DRC’s education system stem from the 1980s when the state’s budget essentially evaporated. Because of structural changes and program implementations within the government, the educational budget was cut from 25% to 7% of national state expenditure. Between 1982 and 2002, teachers’ monthly salaries decreased from $68 to $13. In addition to the governmental modifications that resulted in the economic crisis of the 1990s, wars devastated the DRC. To this day, many natives struggle with the effects of wars that raged between 1996 and 2003. Current violence in the east of the country as well as corruption and poor governance have also been an obstacle to education.

Programs

Enrolling OOSC in South Kivu and Katanga

In the Democratic Republic of the Congo, Educate A Child (EAC) is supporting the International Rescue Committee to implement the Enrolling Out of School Children in South Kivu and Katanga Project to ensure that 47,750 Congolese children who are currently out of school have access to quality formal and non-formal primary education.

Equitable Quality Primary Education for All Children in DRC

In partnership with EAC and the government of the Democratic Republic of the Congo (DRC), UNICEF is implementing the Equitable Quality Primary Education for All Children project in DRC. The aim of this project is to ensure that approximately 1.5 million children in DRC have access to and are enrolled and participating in quality primary education.

The Expansion Project of Support to the Education of OOSC

Through the Expansion Project of Support to the Education of Out of School Children and in partnership with EAC, CARITAS Congo ASBL will provide access to primary education for a total of 46,000 out of school children, and create conditions to significantly reduce the dropout rate in the provinces of Orientale, Equateur , Katanga and Kasai Occidental Kasai Occidental

Underfunding
With a GDP per capita of less than $400, many government programs such as basic education have been left underfunded and underdeveloped. In 2010 only 2.5% of GDP was spent on education, ranking it 159th out of 173.

Schools in the public sector are not organized by the state; instead, they are organized by an ideological or social group.
 unsubsidised schools()
 Catholic schools
 Protestant schools
 Kimbanguist schools
 Islamic schools
 Salutist schools
 Brotherhood schools
 others
The first three groups make up about 80% of the primary schools and 75% of secondary schools. A minority of 12% of the schools are private, though 65% of preschools are private schools.

Armed conflicts 
Years of civil war have left millions displaced and the government shattered throughout the different regions. 
With one of the world’s deadliest civil wars happening the chaos surrounding the entire country has earned the label of Humanitarian Crisis. 
With over 1.9 million people displaced since the beginning of current civil war many have had to migrate farther and farther from cities and towns in order stay alive.

The largest issue with the educational problem in the DRC is that children and families are afraid to go to school. The rebel armies of the DRC such as the Democratic Forces for the Liberation of Rwanda and the National Congress for the Defence of the People are infamous for their use of child soldiers. Schools are one of the main ways these children are abducted and enslaved by these groups.

International organizations
The poor state of the educational system in place several international organizations are looking to help improve the situation.
The lack of help and resources internally has forced the DRC to ask for help from the outside world.

UN
The biggest international supporter of educational programs in the region is the United Nations (UN). Unfortunately the UN has had to deal with large fluctuations in commitment for aid for the DRC in the past decade.  In 2002 the international commitment was less than 100 million USD and in 2007 it peaked above 250 million USD. On top of this uncertainty from donors the UN also has to deal with the local end of corruption and embezzlement of the funds raised. In 2008 2% of the total funds raised for education never made it to the teachers and children that desperately need it. With all of these issues there is more research being done with how to focus the funding on what the country’s children currently need.

IRC
The IRC works to increase access to education for girls and boys in rural and peri-urban areas. The organization also supports marginalized girls to enroll and excel at school and responds to education needs during emergencies. In 2013, 275,000 students were enrolled, 675 schools were supported, 3,378 teachers were trained, 8,706 youth were enrolled in accelerated learning programs, and 827 youth were provided vocational training. This work was carried out through four separate programs: Opportunities for Equitable Access to Quality Basic Education (OPEQ) funded by USAID, Valorisation de la Scolarisation de la Fille Project (VAS-Y Fille!) funded by DFID, Empowering Adolescent Girls to Lead through Education (EAGLE) Project and emergency response programs.

UNICEF
Another major supporter of education in the DRC is the United Nations Children's Fund (UNICEF). Although the organization has suffered from extreme under funding, UNICEF is still trying to bring emergency safe education to the local children. In North Kivu alone, UNICEF  has identified 258 schools which have been looted and/or burnt following attacks and following their occupation by armed groups, imperiling the start of the school year in September for 60,000 children. Despite global recognition of the importance of education in emergencies, education still remains greatly underfunded. UNICEF has only been able to raise 8% of their total goal of 8 million dollars. This funding would allow 228,000 children access to safe and protective education. This would include: establishment of temporary learning spaces, adaptation of the school calendar; reinsertion of children into an appropriate learning environment, psychosocial and recreational activities; awareness raising on life-saving and life-sustaining messages, training of teachers on psychosocial support, peace education and class management, and provision of teaching and learning materials and catch-up classes. Education is a critical protective tool to build preparedness and resilience against future disasters in an ever-changing environment.

Lists

Schools

 American School of Kinshasa
 Institut de N'Djili

Colleges and universities

Research centers and institutes
Centre régional d'études nucléaires de Kinshasa (CREN-K)
Centre d'études égyptologiques Cheik Anta Diop de l'INADEP -formation et recherche
Centre d'Études des Religions Africaines (CERA)
Institut Congolais pour la Conservation de la Nature, ICCN
Institut Africain d'Études Prospectives - INADEP

References